Cylindrocaulus patalis is a beetle of the family Passalidae. It is found in Japan. The larval period is only a month, likely due to parental care. The adults feed on wood.

References 

Passalidae
Insects of Japan